Reverend Samuel Andrew Peters (1735–1826) was a Connecticut Anglican clergyman and historian. A nephew, John Samuel Peters (1772–1858), served as Governor of Connecticut 1831–33.  Another nephew, John Thompson Peters (1765–1834) served as Justice of the Supreme Court of Connecticut 1818–1834.

Biography
Samuel Peters was born December 1, 1735, in Hebron Connecticut Colony, being  third youngest of twelve children of John Peters (1695–1754) and Mary Marks (1698–1784).

In 1757 he graduated from Yale College and was elected Rector of St. Peter's Church, Hebron, Connecticut. In 1758 he sailed to England where he was ordained Deacon in March 1759, before being advanced to the Anglican Priesthood a month later. In the following year he returned to America and took charge of St. Peter's Church parish at Hebron, Connecticut. in 1763 he climbed Killington Peak, and allegedly named the area Verd Mont giving the state its future name.

In August 1774 Peters fled to England after several visits from the "Sons of Liberty" because of his Loyalist sympathies. In 1781 he published, under a pseudonym, "General History of Connecticut, from its first settlement under George Fenwick, to its latest period of amity with Great Britain prior to the Revolution; including a description of the country, and many curious and interesting anecdotes. With an appendix, pointing out the causes of the rebellion in America; together with the particular part taken by the people of Connecticut in its promotion.  By a Gentleman of the Province". This work is noted for its unflattering descriptions of the colonists and for its misrepresentation of the Connecticut Blue Laws. The work was negatively received. In February 1794 he was nominated Anglican Bishop-elect of Vermont but was never consecrated.

Peters returned to America in 1805. In 1817 he visited the Saint Anthony Falls, taking up a large claim there, but again settled in New York in 1818. He died in poverty in New York City on April 19, 1826.

Marriages and issue
 February 14, 1760 : First marriage to Hannah Owen (1740–1765) who bore him three daughters.
 June 25, 1769 : Second marriage to Abigail Gilbert (1751–1769).
 April 20, 1773 : Third marriage to Mary Birdseye (1750-  ) who bore him two sons.

References

Resources
Baker, Mark. Connecticut Families of the Revolution, American Forebears from Burr to Wolcott, The History Press, 2014
Cameron, Kenneth W., ed. The Works of Samuel Peters of Hebron, Connecticut, New England Historian..., Hartford: Transcendental Books, 1967
Cohen, Sheldon S. "Connecticut's Loyalist Gadfly: The Reverend Samuel Andrew Peters", American Revolution Bicentennial Commission of Connecticut Pamphlet XVII (1976)
Cohen, Sheldon S. "Yale's Peripatetic Loyalist: Samuel Andrew Peters", Journal of the New Haven Colony Historical Society (NHCHS) 25 (Summer 1977) 1:3-7
Gencarella, Stephen Olbrys. "The Reverend Samuel Peters’s Natural History: A Reassessment." Folklore 133, no. 3 (2022): 267-288.
Metz, Wayne Normile. "The Reverend Samuel Peters (1735-1826): Connecticut Anglican, Loyalist Priest", Doctoral dissertation, Oklahoma State University, 1974
Middlebrook, Samuel. "Samuel Peters: A Yankee Munchausen", New England Quarterly 20 (March, 1947) 1:75-87
O'Neil, Maud. "Samuel Andrew Peters: Connecticut Loyalist", Doctoral dissertation, University of California, Los Angeles, 1947
Peters, Samuel Andrew. "The Frogs of Windham" a popular chapter from Peters' History of Connecticut... (1781)
Rourke, Constance. See first section of Chapter II in American Humor: A Study of the National Character University of Virginia (2001)
Trumbull, The Reverend Samuel Peters;  His Defenders and Apologists (Hartford, 1877)
Avery, Joshua M., "Subject and Citizen: Loyalty, Memory and Identity in the Monographs of the Reverend Samuel Andrew Peters", M.A. Thesis, Miami University, 2008

External links
The True-blue laws of Connecticut and New Haven : and the false blue-laws invented by the Rev. Samuel Peters : to which are added specimens of the laws and judicial proceedings of other colonies and some blue-laws of England in the reign of James I / edited by J. Hammond Trumbull, Hartford, Conn, American Pub. Co., 1876

1735 births
1826 deaths
People of colonial Connecticut
People from Hebron, Connecticut
18th-century American Episcopal priests
Yale College alumni